Jayasurya (born 31 August 1978) is an Indian actor, distributor, Sponsor, Model,  film producer, playback singer, and impressionist, who works in the Malayalam films. He has appeared in more than 100 films and has won several awards, including a National Film Award, three Kerala State Film Awards, two Filmfare Awards South for acting and Best actor at the Cincinnati Film Festival held in Cincinnati, US. Jayasurya has also appeared in a few Tamil films.

Jayasurya began his career as a mimicry artist and hosted a few television shows on Malayalam channels. He made his acting debut as a background actor in the 1999 film Pathram. His break-through was playing a mute in Oomappenninu Uriyadappayyan (2002). In the 2000s, Jayasurya was popular for his comic-oriented roles in Swapnakkoodu (2003), Pulival Kalyanam (2003), Chathikkatha Chanthu (2004), Chocolate (2007) and Gulumaal (2009), and at the same time villain roles in Classmates (2006), Arabikkatha (2007), and Kangaroo (2007). By the 2010s, Jayasurya gained critical acclaim for his roles, in films such as Cocktail (2010), Janapriyan (2011), Beautiful (2011), Trivandrum Lodge (2012),  Apothecary  (2014), Iyobinte Pusthakam (2014), Lukka Chuppi (2015), Su.. Su... Sudhi Vathmeekam (2015), and Captain (2018). He was also popular for comedy films, such as Punyalan Agarbattis (2013), Amar Akbar Anthony (2015), Aadu (2015) and Aadu 2 (2017). Jayasurya made his debut as a producer by co-producing the film Punyalan Agarbattis and is also credited as playback singer in a few films.

Jayasurya won the Best Supporting Actor Award for his performance in Apothecary at the 62nd Filmfare Awards South. In 2016, Jayasurya won the Special Jury Award at the 46th Kerala State Film Awards and the Special Mention at the 63rd National Film Awards for his performances in the films Su Su Sudhi Vathmeekam and Lukka Chuppi. He won two Kerala State Film Awards for Best Actor for Captain and Njan Marykutty in 2018 and for Vellam in 2020.

Early life and family
Jayasurya was born in 1978, in Tripunithura, Kochi, Kerala.

He did his schooling at St. George U. P. School, Chambakkara, and at Government Sanskrit High School, Tripunithura. He pursued Bachelor of Commerce degree at All Saints College, Ernakulam. After studies he joined mimicry troupes like Crown of Cochin and Kottayam Nazeer's Cochin Discovery.

Personal life
He married his longtime girlfriend Saritha on 25 January 2004. The couple have two children.

Film career
In 2006, Jayasurya appeared in Kilukkam Kilukilukkam, a sequel to Kilukkam. Jayasurya appeared in Bus Conductor. In Classmates, he played the role of Satheesan Kanjikkuzhi, an aspiring student leader; which was considered one of his breakthrough performances. He was then cast in a negative role in Lal Jose's Arabikkatha. This followed villain roles in Hareendran Oru Nishkalankan and Kangaroo. He played a variety of roles in 2007–2008: the romantic lover with a comic touch in Chocolate, the serious police officer in Positive, the humorous drama scriptwriter in Shakespeare M.A. Malayalam, the small-time thief and antagonist in LollyPop, the supporting role in Love in Singapore, and the young politician in Balachandra Menon's  De Ingottu Nokkiye.

The film Cocktail in 2010 was what established a new phase to his career as his performance was critically acclaimed.

In 2011, he appeared in 20 get-ups in T. V. Chandran's fantasy film Sankaranum Mohananum. The same year, he did the lead role in Beautiful which went on to become a great critical success. He played the role of a paraplegic named Stephen and was well received by audiences and critics alike, all saying he has shown the best performance till date and he was the one of the main contenders for best actor nominations in several film award events. Janapriyan and Beautiful were his commercially successful films of the year. In a year-end report on Malayalam cinema, Deepika newspaper applauded Jayasurya for choosing right roles and chose him as the "Star of the Year 2011".

In 2012 he appeared in Trivandrum Lodge and Husbands in Goa which were released on the same day, and were both box office successes. His role as a shady introverted pervert in Trivandrum Lodge was well received by critics and garnered more recognition for him as an established actor. In 2013 he appeared in a crucial role in one of Roshan Andrrews best films Mumbai Police and played the lead role of a don in Hotel California, despite being a box office failure; his role was well favoured by the audience and was recognized as a style statement for the youth of the time. The same year his performance in Shyamaprasad's English: An Autumn in London as a Kathakali artiste-turned-waiter who is an illegal immigrant in United Kingdom won immense critical praise.

Jayasurya turned producer in 2013 with Punyalan Agarbattis, which turned out to be a successful film.

In 2014 his first release was the movie Happy Journey which was directed by Bobban Samuel, though an average grosser his performance in the role as a blind cricket player garnered praise from both critics and audience alike. In August of the same year Apothecary with the director Madhav Ramadasan was released, in which he played the major role apart from Suresh Gopi's role as Dr. Vijay Nambiar, as Subin Joseph a poverty-driven man who suffers from a neurological disorder. The actor lost more than 10 kilos for the role, and his portrayal of the character was immensely praised by critics and the audience, adding to Jayasurya's credibility and his list of notable roles. In the same year
Seconds with director Aneesh Upasana, as the villain inIyobinte Pusthakam with director Amal Neerad, Lal Bahadur Shastri with debutant director Rejishh Midhila's, Akku Akbar's  Mathai Kuzhappakkaranalla and Priyadarsan's Aamayum Muyalum were released.

In 2015, he played the character adu Pappan in Aadu. Despite being a box office failure, the movie as well as his character developed a cult after the movie's DVD version was released. The same year, he acted alongside Prithviraj and Indrajith in Nadirshah's comedy movie Amar Akbar Anthony which was successful at the box office. His performance in Su Su Sudhi Vathmeekam as a stammering person was also appreciated.

Jaysurya's successful movies in 2016 were the comedy horror Pretham and an action comedy movie IDI. However, IDI received mostly negative reviews from critics. His other movies of the year were Shajahanum Pareekuttiyum and School Bus.

In 2019, he won the Kerala State Film Award for Best Actor for his performances in Captain and Njan Marykutty.

He won his third Kerala State Film Award in 2021 as well as the second in Best Actor category for his performance in Vellam., Jayasurya won the best actor at the 20th Dhaka International Film festival for Sunny

Investigative thriller John Luther which is directed by debutant Abhijith Joseph is about to hit the big screens on May 27, 2022. Jayasurya is all set to play the titular role of John Luther, a cop who is trying to unravel the mystery of a road accident and subsequent missing persons case. He also has Eesho, directed by Nadirshah in the pipeline.

Awards and nominations

Filmography

References

External links

 
 
 @jayasurya

Male actors from Kochi
Living people
1978 births
Male actors in Malayalam cinema
Indian male film actors
21st-century Indian male actors
Special Mention (feature film) National Film Award winners
Date of birth missing (living people)